Strictly Come Dancing returned for its ninth series on 10 September 2011 with a launch show, with the live shows starting on 30 September and 1 October 2011. The show was broadcast from Wembley Arena on 19 November with all proceeds going to the BBC charity, Children in Need. The final took place at the  Blackpool Tower Ballroom and was the first episode in 3D, and was shown on BBC HD and 18 cinemas around the country. As in series 8 there are 14 couples with one new male professional, Pasha Kovalev, replacing Jared Murillo.

Sir Bruce Forsyth and Tess Daly continued to present the main show on BBC One, while the results show was presented by Daly and Claudia Winkleman. Former contestant Zoe Ball replaced Winkleman as the regular presenter of the spin-off show Strictly Come Dancing: It Takes Two due to Winkleman's family commitments. On 5 and 6 November Jennifer Grey, the winner of the eleventh series of Dancing with the Stars, the American version of 'Strictly', was a guest judge, replacing Len Goodman while he had a week off. In Goodman's absence, Craig Revel Horwood was head Judge.

The full lineup of celebrities was revealed on 6 September 2011 on The One Show. As in the previous series, the celebrities did not know who would be their professional partner until they were introduced to each other at the Launch Show. McFly drummer Harry Judd and Aliona Vilani won the show on 17 December 2011. Vilani also became the third female professional to reach two consecutive finals, after Lilia Kopylova and Erin Boag, having come second with Matt Baker in 2010.

This was Alesha Dixon's last series as a judge after three years, which the BBC announced on 2 January 2012, where she left the show as a judge for rival show, Britain's Got Talent. She was replaced by series 7 judge Darcey Bussell for the tenth series, where she lasted for seven years until 2018.

Couples

Scoring chart

Average chart
This table only counts for dances scored on a traditional 40-points scale (the scores for the Swing-a-Thon in Week 9 have not been included)

Couples' highest and lowest scoring dances

Highest and lowest scoring performances of the series 
The best and worst performances in each dance according to the judges' marks are as follows:

   
Rory Bremner and Holly Valance are the only celebrities not to be on this list.

Weekly scores and songs
Unless indicated otherwise, individual judges scores in the charts below (given in parentheses) are listed in this order from left to right: Craig Revel Horwood, Len Goodman, Alesha Dixon, Bruno Tonioli.

Launch show
Musical guest: Dolly Parton – "Together You and I"

Week 1

Night 1 – Friday

Running order

Night 2 – Saturday

Running order

Week 2 

Musical guest: Will Young – "Come On"
Running order

Week 3: Broadway Night 

Musical guests: Kenny Wormald & Julianne Hough—"Holding Out for a Hero" / "Footloose" and Susan Boyle—"Unchained Melody"
Running order

Week 4  

Musical guest: Caro Emerald – "That Man"
Running order

Week 5: Halloween Night  

Musical guests: The Wanted – "Lightning"
Running order

Week 6  

Individual judges scores in the chart below (given in parentheses) are listed in this order from left to right: Craig Revel Horwood, Jennifer Grey, Alesha Dixon, Bruno Tonioli.

Musical guests: Westlife – "Flying Without Wings" and Bruce Forsyth – "Young and Foolish"
Running order

Week 7  

Musical guest(s): Christina Perri – "Jar of Hearts" and André Rieu & his Johann Strauss Orchestra – "We'll Meet Again"
Running order

* Due to an injury in his back, Artem missed out this week and Brendan stepped in to partner Holly. However, Artem still choreographed their routine.

Week 8: Best of Britain-Live at Wembley  
This week's show was broadcast live from Wembley Arena.
Musical guest(s): James Morrison & Jessie J – "Up" and Il Divo – "Time to Say Goodbye"
Running order

Week 9

Musical guest(s): Cee Lo Green – "Anyway"
Running order

*Due to his injury, Robin was unable to dance this week, and Anita danced with Brendan instead.

Week 10: Movie Night (Quarter-final)

Musical guest(s): Alfie Boe – "Live and Let Die"/"Nobody Does It Better"/"We Have All the Time in the World"
Running order

Week 11: Semi-final
Musical guest(s): Aloe Blacc – "I Need A Dollar" and Military Wives with Gareth Malone – "Wherever You Are"
Running order

Week 12: Final (Blackpool) 
Musical guest(s): Jessie J – "Price Tag"

Show 1
Running order

Show 2
Running order

 There was also a dance from the eliminated contestants of the series to "I Wanna Dance With Somebody" by Whitney Houston.

Dance chart

 Pro injured

 Highest scoring dance
 Lowest scoring dance 
                                                                       

 Week 1: Waltz or Cha-Cha-Cha
 Week 2: Foxtrot or Salsa
 Week 3 – Broadway Night: One unlearned dance (including Jive, Quickstep, Rumba, Tango and Viennese Waltz)
 Week 4: One unlearned dance (including American Smooth, Paso Doble and Samba)
 Week 5 – Halloween Night: One unlearned dance
 Week 6: One unlearned dance (including Charleston)
 Week 7: One unlearned dance (including Argentine Tango)
 Week 8 – Wembley Week (Best of Britain): One unlearned dance
 Week 9: One unlearned dance & Swing Marathon
 Week 10 – Movie Night: One unlearned dance
 Week 11 – Semi-final: Two unlearned dances
 Week 12 (Show 1): Judges' choice of previous dance and Showdance
 Week 12 (Show 2): One unlearned dance and couple's favourite dance of the series

TV Ratings
Weekly ratings for each show on BBC1. Figures exclude the BBC HD Channel. All numbers are in millions and provided by BARB

References

External links

Season 09
2011 British television seasons